
Gmina Zawadzkie is an urban-rural gmina (administrative district) in Strzelce County, Opole Voivodeship, in south-western Poland.

Villages
Apart from the town of Zawaszkie, the gmina also contains the villages of Kielcza and Żędowice.

Neighbouring gminas
Gmina Zawadzkie is bordered by the gminas of Dobrodzień, Jemielnica, Kolonowskie, Krupski Młyn, Pawonków and Wielowieś.

Twin towns – sister cities

Gmina Zawadzkie is twinned with:

 Bockenem, Germany
 Chortkiv, Ukraine
 Dubnica nad Váhom, Slovakia
 Otrokovice, Czech Republic
 Uebigau-Wahrenbrück, Germany
 Vác, Hungary

References

Zawadzkie